Cho Byung-min (born 4 September 1989) is a South Korean professional golfer.

Cho played on the Korean Tour in 2014 and 2016 and PGA Tour China in 2015. He earned a 2016 Japan Golf Tour card through qualifying school and won the Kansai Open Golf Championship in his first start on that tour. It was Cho's first professional win.

Professional wins (1)

Japan Golf Tour wins (1)

References

External links

South Korean male golfers
Japan Golf Tour golfers
1989 births
Living people